María Jiménez Gallego (born 3 February 1950) is a Spanish singer.

Biography 
María Jiménez Gallego was born on 3 February 1950 in Triana, Seville. At age 15, she migrated to Barcelona to work as a housemaid. She started to perform in tablaos (first in Barcelona and then in Madrid) and recorded her first album in 1976, with arrangements by Paco Cepero. The album included rumbas, tangos, bulerías, boleros, rancheras and ballads by Silvio Rodríguez, Lolita de la Colina or Amancio Prada. Next, she released Sensación and several compilations. 

Her career was relaunched when she collaborated in the song  La lista de la compra with the group La cabra mecánica and released Donde más duele with songs by Joaquín Sabina.

She was married twice (1980, 1987) and twice divorced (1984, 2002) to the actor Pepe Sancho and they had a son, Alejandro. She had had another child, María del Rocío in a previous relationship, who later died in a traffic accident. She is outspoken on the issue of piracy and participated in the 2002 'Day Without Music' protest.

She has edited her biography and taken part in several films and sitcoms like Todos los hombres sois iguales. 

She is the presenter of the TV program Bienaventurados on Canal Sur.

Partial discography

Bienaventurados (2006)
Genio y figura (2005)
 Háblame En la cama - Lo mejor
Canta Jose Alfredo Jimenez (2005)
De María a María con sus dolores (2003)
Donde más duele - Canta por Sabina (2002)
40 grandes canciones, (2000) recopilación
Canciones arrebatadas recopilación 1976-1980
Eres como eres (1995)
Átame a tu cuerpo (1993)
Rocios (1988)
Alma Salvaje (1987)
Seguir viviendo (1986)
Voy a darte una canción (1984)
Por primera vez (1983)
Frente al amor (1982)
De distinto modo (1981)
Sensación (1980)
Resurrección de la alegría (1979)
Se acabó (1978)
María Jiménez (1976)
María La Pipa (1975)

Filmography 
Yo, puta, 2003
Los managers, 2006

References

External links

1950 births
Living people
People from Seville
Spanish women singers
Spanish people of Romani descent